is a Japanese holding company that primarily owns Seibu Railway, Prince Hotels, and Seibu Bus and its subsidiaries, which are collectively known as the . In total, fifty-three companies across the world are affiliated with the Seibu Group. The company was formed in 2006 to restructure the group after it had come to light in 2004 that the predecessor to Seibu Holdings, Kokudo, had falsified the ownership of its shares in Seibu Railway for over forty years.

As of January 2015, Seibu Holdings' share prices exceed ¥2900 and the company has the highest market capitalization of any Japanese company which owns a private rail network.

History

In 2004, the Seibu Group collapsed due to the revelation that the head of Kokudo (the predecessor of Seibu Holdings), Yoshiaki Tsutsumi, had falsified financial statements for over forty years. The scandal, which involved falsifying the ownership of Kokudo's share holdings in Seibu Railway, was compounded by the increased competition faced by Prince Hotels in the hotel and leisure market as well as an additional pay-off scandal involving a corporate racketeer. Seibu Railway was consequently delisted from the Tokyo Stock Exchange in December 2004 after shares fell to ¥400 from a peak of ¥8000. As a response to this, Seibu Holdings was founded on February 3, 2006 with the aim of restructuring the group following an investment of ¥100 billion from the American private equity firm Cerberus Capital Management.  Tsutsumi, having pleaded guilty to the fraud charges in 2005, retained a 5% stake in Seibu Holdings having previously owned a 36% stake in Kokudo.

The company has been directed by Takashi Gotō since its creation in 2006. He is also a company board member for Prince Hotels (since 2006) and Seibu Railway (since 2010).

Despite paying out ¥5.2 billion in compensation as a result of lawsuits concerning the scandals of 2004, the company made a net profit of ¥16.3 billion in fiscal 2013, an increase of 5% when compared to the previous year. In April 2014, Seibu Holdings was listed on the First Section of the Tokyo Stock Exchange where shares had originally been evaluated at ¥2300. After Cerberus abandoned plans to sell a 15.5% stake of the business, however, shares began at the lower offering price of ¥1600 when they were relisted on April 23, 2014. The company ended the day at ¥1770 per share. In total, 27.8 million shares (about 8% of Seibu Holding's outstanding stock) were relisted. It was later revealed that Cerberus had an agreement with their managing underwriter prohibiting them from selling their share in Seibu Holdings until October 2014. The company exceeded its original ¥2300 per share evaluation in June 2014, with its share prices rising to ¥2945 on January 21, 2015.

On January 19, 2015, Seibu Holdings' market capitalization of ¥975 billion overtook that of the Tokyu Corporation. Consequently, Seibu Holdings attained the highest market capitalization of any Japanese company which owns a private rail network.

Businesses

Seibu Holdings is a holding company which has ownership over fifty-three companies. The companies that are affiliated with Seibu Holdings are collectively known as the Seibu Group. As of March 2014, it directly employs 371 people.

Seibu Holdings entirely owns Seibu Railway, a major passenger railway company founded in 1912. The company, which employs over 3,700, owns 176.6 kilometers of track and ninety-two stations in western Tokyo and Saitama. Statistics released by the company for fiscal 2013 state that its railway network serves 1.7 million people daily resulting in an annual revenue of ¥140.7 billion.

The hotel chain Prince Hotels is also owned in its entirety by Seibu Holdings. Formed in 1956, the chain caters largely for the Japanese tourism market with fifty hotels within the country but also has a limited number of overseas resorts in Hawaii, Taiwan and Malaysia. Statistics released by the company state that, at the end of the 2013 fiscal year, there were 6,737 employees and that its capital stock was ¥3.6 billion. Seibu Holdings has announced plans for Prince Hotels offices to be established in Taiwan by October 2014 in order to cater for Taiwanese tourists, with whom the chain has proved most popular in terms of international tourist numbers.

A diverse range of enterprises including: pet care, transportation and real estate are affiliated with Seibu Holdings. Some of Seibu Holdings' subsidiaries have subsidiaries themselves. For example: Seibu Hire, Seibu Kankō Bus, Seibu Sōgōkikaku and Seibu Kōgen Bus are all subsidiaries of Seibu Bus. The table below details the companies affiliated with Seibu Holdings listed in Japanese hiragana order.

External links
 Seibu Group website 
 Seibu Railway website 
 Prince Hotels website

References

Companies listed on the Tokyo Stock Exchange
Holding companies based in Tokyo
Service companies based in Tokyo
Transport companies based in Tokyo
Seibu Group